Route 150, locally known as St. Anne's Road (French: Chemin Ste. Anne), is a major arterial route in Winnipeg, Manitoba, Canada. 

It branches off from St. Mary's Road in north St. Vital and runs southeastward through central and southern St. Vital to the Perimeter Highway. It is a collector road for traffic between south St. Boniface, central and south St. Vital, and downtown. St. Anne's Road from St. Mary's Road to Fermor Avenue is part of the Trans-Canada Highway. 

St. Anne's Road continues south of the Perimeter Highway and ends at the Red River Floodway.  This part of the road was formerly signed as Provincial Road 300. 

History
Prior to the construction of the Red River Floodway and Highway 59, St. Anne's Road was a heavily-used road connecting Winnipeg with the community of Ste. Anne, Manitoba, and much of southeastern Manitoba, including the town of Steinbach. Sections of the original country road still exist in the Rural Municipalities of Taché and Ste. Anne, but is no longer a continuous road. 

Outside of Winnipeg, the road is generally spelled Ste. Anne's Road (French: Chemin Sainte-Anne).

In 2013, the Manitoba government unveiled future plans to construct an interchange at the junction of the Perimeter and St. Anne's Road, to replace the at-grade intersection and traffic lights that currently exist. This plan was subsequently withdrawn. According to a 2020 report, there will be an interchange built to replace the intersection, however there is currently no timeline for construction nor funding in place.

Major intersections
From north to south, all intersections are at-grade unless otherwise indicated.

References

150
Urban segments of the Trans-Canada Highway
St. Vital, Winnipeg
Saint Boniface, Winnipeg